Transylvania is a 2006 French drama film starring Asia Argento. In 2006, Director Tony Gatlif and composer Delphine Mantoulet won the Georges Delerue Prize at the Flanders International Film Festival for the score, and Gatlif was nominated for the Grand Prix award. Transylvania premiered at the 2006 Cannes Film Festival in France on 28 May, and premiered in the United States on 16 March 2007 at the Cleveland International Film Festival and in the United Kingdom at the Cambridge Film Festival on 6 July 2007 (with a later theatrical release on 10 August 2007).

Plot
Zingarina (Asia Argento), a rebellious Italian girl who travels to Transylvania with her best friend Marie (Amira Casar) and a young interpreter, Luminita (Alexandra Beaujard), seeking her fiancee and father of the baby she's expecting, Milan Agustin (Morgan), who has been expelled from France, the country where they had met and fallen in love. She knows he's a travelling musician and plays in a gypsy band.
Zingarina finds Milan at the winter "Herod's Carnaval" (Festival of customs and traditions) but he tells her that their love story is over. 
The girl, angry and crushed, doesn't want to return to France or Italy. Marie is angry too so she fires Luminita because she thinks they have to leave from Transylvania.

Zingarina exploits a temporary absence of Marie (the woman was at a phone-cabine) for running away from her (leaving a note only), in order to go after Vandana, a vagrant little girl. In her aimless travel through the boulevards and the villages, Zingarina meets Tchangalo (Birol Unel), a charming travelling merchant of Turkish descent. Between them there's a kind of comprehension and solidarity; then a love feeling.
Even if Tchangalo is a man without borders and without ties, he accepts Zingarina (even the idea of forming a family with her); Tchangalo also accepts Zingarina's baby, even if he's not his natural son.

Cast
 Asia Argento as Zingarina
 Amira Casar as Marie
 Birol Ünel as Tchangalo
 Alexandra Beaujard as Luminitsa
 Marco Castoldi as Milan Agustin
 Bea Palya as the cabaret singer (as Beáta Palya)
 Rares Budileanu as the young musician
 Gabor as Gabor, the peasant at the sled

References

External links
 Producers' official website has a sub-page for the film.
 

2006 films
Culture of Transylvania
Films directed by Tony Gatlif
Transylvania in fiction
French drama road movies
2000s drama road movies
Georges Delerue Award winners
2000s French films